Elena F. Engel is a producer/director of film, video, radio, and audio for The Walt Disney Company, Amblin Entertainment, Simon & Schuster Films, UNICEF (United Nations), Western Publishing Company, National Public Radio, Warner Brothers Inc., Sesame Street, and The Disney Channel.

Early life and education
Elena Engel was born in New York to actress Lillian Engel and theater director Sanford Engel. She attended high school at Point Loma in San Diego, California and went on to get a B.A. in Psychology from The Evergreen State College. Elena pursued graduate work at the University of Washington in creative dramatics where she was an ensemble member of the Poncho's Children's Theatre. She then continued her studies at Actors Studio with Lee Strasberg in Hollywood, California.

Career
Engel's career spans more than 20 years in the entertainment industry an award-winning writer, producer, and director of film, video, radio and audio recordings. During this time she served as a creative resource to The Walt Disney Company, Warner Brothers, Inc., Steven Spielberg's Amblin Entertainment, Simon & Schuster, Western Publishing Company, National Public Radio, and The United Nations.

Public Radio
As Director of Children's Programming at member station KWAX, her weekly show "Kidwax" enjoyed top creative honors from the Corporation for Public Broadcasting three years running. As a recipient of a CPB Producer's Grant with WGBH and a CPB Technical Engineering Grant, Elena went on to produce a radio series featuring traditional storytellers of the Northwest and funded by the National Endowment of the Arts. She also was a regular features contributor to NPR's "All Things Considered".

The Walt Disney Company
Joining The Walt Disney Company, as Writer-Producer-Director of children's audio, Elena received a Grammy nomination, four Gold and two Platinum albums for her efforts. Later, as Executive Producer of Film and video at Disney's Non-Theatrical division, Elena piloted more than seventeen award-winning live action and animated films for the cable television, home video and educational divisions. In addition, she was a creative development contributor to both the EPCOT Educational pavilion at Walt Disney World and the Disney Channel.

Azimuth Productions
Following her work with Disney, Elena formed her own company Azimuth Productions, producing video and film with the talents of Michael Tucker, Joe Spano, Tempestt Bledsoe, Loretta Swit, Ally Sheedy, Giovanni Ribisi, and others. Through Azimuth, Elena also wrote, produced and directed original audio recordings featuring the popular Tiny Toons, Looney Tunes, Super Mario Brothers, Dennis the Menace and Batman characters, as well as developed original children's program concepts for the television market. During this period her film, "Listen to Me," a dramatic story about child abuse, won the prestigious Lillian Gish Award at the Women in Film International Film Festival.

Philanthropy
Elena's humanitarian and non-profit projects have included travel around the world on behalf of UNICEF producing programs televised in more than forty-five countries for its International Child Survival Campaign. Elena also completed consultation and video projects in support of Mercy Corp International, an NGO providing humanitarian aid and development assistance to communities worldwide. She served on its European Executive board while living in the United Kingdom for the last six years.

Professional Credits
 THE WALT DISNEY COMPANY – Executive Producer Film/Video Non-theatrical ( Five Cine-Golden Awards, Winner of Lillian Gish Award Women in Film Festival, Birmingham Intl. festival and others.
 Audio Producer- (Grammy Nomination, Four Gold, Two Platinum albums) Corporate Development Liaison to EPCOT Disney World, Orlando Fl. Disney Channel-Development
 AZIMUTH PRODUCTIONS – President/owner, video/film production- Tempestt Bledsoe, Giovanni Ribisi, Ally Sheedy, Loretta Swit, Joe Spano, Michael Tucker. Audio recordings- Tiny Toons, Looney Tunes, Super Mario Brothers, Dennis the Menace, Batman.
 NATIONAL PUBLIC RADIO – Director of Children's Programming. Top CPB Creative honors for three years. Recipient of CPB Producer's Grant at WGBH, CPB Technical Training Grant and a Radio series grant from National Endowment of the Arts.
 UNITED NATIONS – Producer/Director of educational television programs distributed world-wide for UNICEF'S Child Survival Campaign. Official Selection-Annecy International Animation Festival, Switzerland
 MERCY-CORPS INTERNATIONAL – World Ambassador, Executive board member, Producer of support videos and Director of Corporate Development in NYC. Consultant to Sesame Street Productions/ Mercy Corps video partnership for Haitian earthquake victims.

References

American film producers
American radio producers
Living people
University of Oregon alumni
University of Washington alumni
Year of birth missing (living people)
Women radio producers